The 1970 Victorian Football League finals series was the 74th annual edition of the VFL/AFL final series, the Australian rules football tournament staged to determine the winner of the 1970 VFL Premiership season. The series ran over four weekends in September 1970, culminating with the 1970 VFL Grand Final at the Melbourne Cricket Ground on 26 September 1970.

Qualification 

The top four teams on the ladder at the end of the home-and-away rounds of the 1970 VFL Premiership season qualified for the finals series. It was the first season in which featured 22 home-and-away rounds, meaning that each club played all the others twice.

Venues
All the finals matches were hosted at the Melbourne Cricket Ground and for the second straight year, official crowd attendances at each finals match exceeded 100,000 spectators. Although VFL Park had hosted its first VFL match in April 1970, the stadium's construction was not yet complete and all finals remained contracted to the Melbourne Cricket Ground until at least 1971, and so the new would not host its first VFL final until 1972.

Matches

The system used for the 1970 VFL finals series was the Page–McIntyre system, also known as the McIntyre final four system, which had been used by the VFL since 1931. The first- and second-placed teams would contest the second semi-final, while the third- and fourth-placed teams would contest the first semi-final. The loser of the first semi-final would be eliminated, while the winner would advance to the preliminary final, while the loser of the second semi-final would receive a "double chance" in the preliminary final, and the winner would advance directly to the grand final. The winner of the preliminary final would then play off in the grand final, and the loser would be eliminated.

Week one: First Semi-final (St Kilda v South Melbourne)

Teams
The First Semi-final saw third-placed  play fourth-placed  at the MCG. South Melbourne was competing in its first VFL finals series since 1945 and were the sentimental favourite, while the Saints were competing in their seventh finals series in the last ten seasons, and still had a number of their stars from the 1966 premiership triumph. Interestingly, this was the first time the two clubs had met in a VFL final, despite being foundation members of the VFL. It was a special occasion for Swans captain Bob Skilton, who had returned to action after missing the whole of 1969 due to a snapped Achilles – he was playing his first final in his 218th game, which at the time set the record for the longest wait for any VFL/AFL player before playing in a final.

Match summary
Bigger, more experienced, cooler in the crises, St Kilda ended the fairytale VFL season of South Melbourne and Bobby Skilton at the Melbourne Cricket Ground on Saturday.
A hundred and four thousand people welcomed Skilton on to the ground with a tremendous roar. The vast majority cheered for his men throughout the match, but it was not enough.
Fifteen great minutes in the second quarter saw South Melbourne grab the lead at half-time. For the rest of the match it was just a case of a fine smaller team pitting determination against a slightly more gifted and appreciably bigger team with even more discipline. In the end, height, weight and discipline told, and St Kilda won comfortably by
53 points.

Scorecard

Week two: Second Semi-final (Collingwood v Carlton)

The Second Semi-final saw  play  at the MCG. This was the 14th meeting between the two clubs in finals, having previously met in the 1969 Second Semi-final. Carlton had won nine of the encounters, including the last six meetings.

Teams

Match summary
Collingwood, the hottest VFL favourite in a decade, won its way into the 1970 grand final on Saturday, but three players almost confounded its expectations.
Collingwood had a far more even team, won the ball more often, outmarked its opponents by 77 to 51 yet lost the lead in every quarter and got home by only 10 points.
Amid the tension bordering on delirium which always accompanies a Collingwood-Carlton finals clash, the lead changed 10 times before the biggest semi-final crowd in history. 

Scorecard

Week three: Preliminary final (Carlton v St Kilda)

The Preliminary final saw  play  at the MCG on Saturday, 19 September. This was the fourth final between the two clubs, having previously met in the finals in 1907, 1908 and 1929, with Carlton winning all three encounters.

Teams

Match summary
In what was predicted to be a close match, Carlton blew away St Kilda in the second half. 
In what turned out to be a chilling premonition, esteemed veteran journalist Rohan Rivett wrote the following in his article covering the game for the Canberra Times:

As Collingwood's coach, Bob Rose, watched Carlton's weak links of the previous week becoming bastions of strength, he must have wondered if once
again his hopes of a Collingwood premiership will be dashed at the eleventh hour..

Scorecard

Week four (Grand Final)

References

Bibliography

External links

AFL finals series official website

VFL/AFL Grand Finals
Australian rules football